Jon Finkel (born May 18, 1978) is an American Magic: The Gathering and poker player. Finkel is one of the most decorated players in the history of professional Magic: The Gathering play and is widely regarded as one of the greatest players of all-time. During his career he has won three Grand Prix events and made the Top 8 of a record 16 Pro Tour events, winning three of those. In the year 2000, he became the Magic: The Gathering World Champion, as well as playing for the United States National Team, which won the team portion of the competition.

Career
Finkel was born in Brockport, New York, but moved with his family to Woking, UK, in the summer of 1992 and learned about Magic: The Gathering shortly thereafter at a local game shop named Fun and Games. After he returned to the New York area in 1995 Finkel quickly made friends with the "OMS brothers", Steven and Daniel O'Mahoney-Schwartz.

In 1996 the first Pro Tour was held in New York. Finkel competed in the Junior Division of the tournament, made it to the Top 8, and won a $1,000 scholarship. After reaching another Top 8 in the Junior Division of Pro Tour Columbus Finkel had his first appearance in the senior competition of the Pro Tour at the 1996 World Championship in Seattle. A ninth-place finish earned him $3,200.

Finkel had three Top 16 finishes in the 1996–97 season, but never made it to the finals. His first Top 8 appearance was at Pro Tour Chicago 1997. In the same season Finkel won his first Grand Prix title in Rio de Janeiro, his first Pro Tour title in New York; finished third at US Nationals and the World Championship, and eventually claimed the Pro Player of the Year title.

The 1998–99 season opened with Finkel winning another Grand Prix in Boston and making his third consecutive Top 8 appearance, a feat only once before achieved by Scott Johns. Finkel finished the season second to Kai Budde in the Pro Player of the Year race. At the first Team Pro Tour in Washington the following season Finkel finished third with his friends and teammates Daniel and Steven O'Mahoney-Schwartz. After some mediocre finishes in the middle of the season Finkel won the US Nationals as well as the team and the individual portion of the World Championship. Eventually Finkel finished third in the Pro Player of the Year race. Later in 2000 Finkel also won the Magic Invitational, giving him the chance to design his own Magic card. His creation, debuted in the Odyssey set and was later reprinted in Time Spiral and Modern Masters 2015 edition.

After two additional Top 8 appearances in the 2000–01 season Finkel's performances dropped in the 2001–02 season. Two Top 8s in 2002–03 were followed by another drop in 2003–04 and eventually by Finkel retiring from professional play. In 2005 he was inducted into the Hall of Fame as the vote leader of the inaugural class. This allowed him to attend further Pro Tours without having to qualify. In 2008 Finkel thus attended and won Pro Tour Kuala Lumpur, becoming the first player to win a Pro Tour after his induction into the Hall of Fame. Magic head designer Mark Rosewater commented on the occasion, "[Finkel] is the most naturally gifted player the game has ever seen. His accomplishments are rivaled by only one other man [Budde]".

In recent years, Finkel, like fellow Magic players David Williams and Noah Boeken, has been playing in high-level poker tournaments. He currently works as a managing partner at the hedge fund Landscape Capital Management.

As of 2021, Finkel was the Treasurer of the board of directors of Gamers Helping Gamers,  a nonprofit organization that assists aspiring college students who play Magic: The Gathering by awarding them tuition scholarships.

Accomplishments

In addition Finkel was inducted into the Hall of Fame as the class of 2005 vote leader. Finkel holds the highest vote percentage of any inductee.

In popular culture
Finkel is the subject of a 2005 biography by author David Kushner, entitled Jonny Magic & the Card Shark Kids—How a Gang of Geeks Beat the Odds and Stormed Las Vegas. The book recounts Finkel's rise to Magic stardom and his subsequent exploits as a poker player and Blackjack card counter.

In 2011, Alyssa Bereznak, an intern for tech website Gizmodo wrote an article about two dates she had with Finkel, which was picked up by Forbes, The Washington Post and CBS. The article was critical of Finkel for not revealing he played Magic on his OkCupid dating profile, eliciting negative comments against the writer from a number of people involved in tech and geek culture, notably actress Felicia Day and Playboy Playmate of the Year Sara Jean Underwood.

References

External links
 Hendon Mob poker tournament results

1978 births
Living people
American Magic: The Gathering players
People from New York City
People from Brockport, New York
People from Woking
Players who have won the Magic: The Gathering World Championship